Việt Võ Đạo may refer to:
 the philosophy of Vovinam 
 Vietnamese martial arts in general